"Veronica" is a song by Elvis Costello, released in 1989 as the lead single from the album Spike. The song was co-written by Costello with Paul McCartney, and was co-produced with T-Bone Burnett and Kevin Killen, and features Paul McCartney on his iconic Höfner bass. In 2004, Entertainment Weekly voted it one of Costello's top ten greatest tunes.

"Veronica" was also Costello's highest-charting top 40 hit in the United States, peaking at No. 19 on the Billboard Hot 100 singles chart, No. 1 on its Hot Modern Rock Tracks chart, and No. 10 on its Mainstream Rock Tracks chart.

Background 
The song focuses on an older woman who has experienced severe memory loss. Costello's inspiration for this song was his grandmother, who suffered from Alzheimer's. When talking about the song on a VH1 interview, Costello reminisced about his grandmother having "terrifying moments of lucidity" and how this was the inspiration for "Veronica". In his 2015 autobiography, Unfaithful Music & Disappearing Ink, Costello wrote of his collaboration with McCartney, "I'd brought an early version of 'Veronica' that you would have recognized. . . . All the words I'd already written were about my paternal grandmother, Molly, or more formally, Mabel Josephine Jackson. In fact, her Catholic confirmation name, Veronica, provided the very title of the song."

Non-album B-sides 
The single featured multiple covers as B-sides, both of which were later released on the 2001 bonus disc to Spike.

 "You're No Good" - 7"
 "The Room Nobody Lives In" - 12"

Music video
"Veronica" and its accompanying video depicts an aged woman, probably nearing the end of her life in a retirement home, engaging in detached reminiscences from her life from young girl to young womanhood (played by Zoe Carides). The video for "Veronica" featured Costello delivering a spoken-word monologue to the camera, and occasionally singing the song softly over the original vocal track from the recording. The video, co-directed by John Hillcoat and Evan English, earned an MTV Video Music Award for Best Male Video.

Charts

See also
List of Billboard number-one alternative singles of the 1980s

References

External links

1989 songs
1989 singles
Elvis Costello songs
MTV Video Music Award for Best Male Video
Songs written by Elvis Costello
Songs written by Paul McCartney
Song recordings produced by T Bone Burnett
Warner Records singles
Songs based on actual events
Songs about old age
Song recordings produced by Elvis Costello